Iphtahel, also known as the Valley of Iphtahel is a Biblical Valley in Nazareth, Israel.

References

Google Maps

Hebrew Bible places
Nazareth